Septeuil is a commune in the Yvelines department in the Île-de-France region in north-central France.

River

Septeuil is traversed by a small river, la Flexanville. The Flexanville is a tributary of the Vaucouleurs which in turn empties into the Seine.

See also
Communes of the Yvelines department

References

Communes of Yvelines